Gammelgaard is a Danish surname. Notable people with the surname include:

Jørgen Gammelgaard (1938–1991), Danish furniture designer
Lene Gammelgaard (born 1961), Danish author, motivational speaker, lawyer, journalist, and mountaineer

Danish-language surnames